Dąbale is a part of the village of Stany located in the Bojanów Commune, Stalowa Wola County, Subcarpathian Voivodeship, Poland.

In the years 1975–1998, Dąbale administratively belonged to the Tarnobrzeg Voivodeship.

References

Dąbale
Kingdom of Galicia and Lodomeria
Lwów Voivodeship